Kelo is a moribund Nilo-Saharan language spoken in Sudan.

A closely related variety called Beni Sheko has been documented by Bender (1997). Beni Sheko speakers consider themselves to be part of the same ethnic groups as Kelo speakers (Bender 1997: 190).

References

External links
 Kelo basic lexicon at the Global Lexicostatistical Database

Critically endangered languages
Eastern Jebel languages
Languages of Sudan